Sagara Kariyawasam(born 13 November 1967) is a Sri Lankan lawyer, politician, and Member of Parliament (MP).

Kariyawasam was born on 13 November 1967. He is the son of Albert Kariyawasum, who was a renowned politician from Southern province. He is a lawyer and general-secretary of the Sri Lanka Podujana Peramuna. Following the 2020 Sri Lankan parliamentary election, he was appointed to the Parliament of Sri Lanka as a National List MP representing the Sri Lanka People's Freedom Alliance.

References

1967 births
Living people
Members of the 16th Parliament of Sri Lanka
Sinhalese lawyers
Sinhalese politicians
Sri Lankan Buddhists
Sri Lanka People's Freedom Alliance politicians
Sri Lanka Podujana Peramuna politicians